Behnisch Architekten is an architectural practice based in Stuttgart, Germany, with branches in Munich, Germany; Boston, Massachusetts and Los Angeles, California.

The office was founded in 1989 by Stefan Behnisch, son of the well-known German architect Günter Behnisch. Among the works from Günter Behnisch are the stadium for the 1972 Summer Olympics in Munich (1967–1972), the German parliament in Bonn and the Academy of Arts in Berlin. In 2005, after several changes in structure and name, the independent Stadtbüro adopted today`s name, Behnisch Architekten. Under Stefan Behnisch's leadership, the firm has developed over the last more than 25 years into a successful international practice with offices in Stuttgart (since 1991), Los Angeles (1999-2011), Boston (since 2006), and Munich (since 2009). The Los Angeles office reopened under the leadership of Kristi Paulson in 2019. All four firms operate under the name of Behnisch Architekten.

The offices are managed by the firm partners, Stefan Behnisch, Robert Hoesle, Robert Matthew Noblett, Stefan Rappold, Kristi Paulson and Jörg Usinger. In the firm's rich history, former partners include Günter Behnisch, Winfried Büxel, David Cook, Martin Haas, Christof Jantzen, Manfred Sabatke, Günther Schaller and Erhard Tränkner.

Projects

Finished (selected projects) 
 1997 Landesgirokasse am Bollwerk, Stuttgart, Germany
 1997 Administration building for the LVA-Landesversicherungsanstalt, Lübeck, Germany
 1996 Bayrische Vereinsbank, Stuttgart, Germany
 1996 Catholic St. Benno-grammar school, Dresden, Germany
 1998 IBN-Institute for Forestry and Nature Research, Wageningen, Netherlands
 1999 Swimming Pool Complex Grünauer Welle, Leipzig, Germany
 2001 Museum der Phantasie – Lothar-Günther-Buchheim-Collection, Bernried am Starnberger See, Germany
 2002 Norddeutsche Landesbank am Friedrichswall, Hanover, Germany
 2002 Technology Building for the University Ilmenau, Ilmenau, Germany
 2003 Entory Home, Ettlingen, Germany
 2004 Headquarter Genzyme Center, Cambridge, Massachusetts, USA
 2004 Pistorius-School, Herbrechtingen, Germany
 2005 Terrence Donnelly Centre for Cellular and Biomolecular Research (with architectsAlliance), Toronto, Canada
 2007 Spa Baths Bad Aibling, Bad Aibling, Germany
 2007 Haus im Haus for the Chamber of Commerce Hamburg, Hamburg, Germany
 2007 Hilde-Domin-School, Herrenberg, Germany
 2007 Werner-von-Linde-Halle, Munich
 2007 Römerbad, Spa Bath in Bad Kleinkirchheim, Austria
 2008 Ozeaneum - German Oceanographic Museum, Stralsund, Germany
 2008 Kovner Residence, Sebastopol, California, USA
 2009 Unilever Headquarters Germany, Austria and Switzerland, Hamburg, Germany
 2010 Marco-Polo-Tower, Hamburg, Germany
 2010 NCT-National Centre for Tumour Diseases, Heidelberg, Germany
 2010 Park Street Building (with Svigals + Partners, LLP, New Haven), Yale, New Haven, Connecticut, USA
 2010 Quest Forum 'An der Alten Spinnerei', Kolbermoor, Germany
 2010 Refurbishment, Modernization and Extension of the Hysolar Building (with H III S, Harder Stumpfl Schramm), Stuttgart, Germany
 2011 WIPO Administration Building – World Intellectual Property Organization, Geneva, Switzerland
 2011 Speed Skating Stadium Inzell – Max Aicher Arena (with Pohl Architekten), Inzell, Germany
 2011 Loft Houses, Kolbermoor, Germany
 2012 Maximino Martinez Commons, University of California Student Apartments, Berkeley, California, USA
 2012 City Hall Kolbermoor with Library and Education Center, Kolbermoor, Germany
 2012 Children's Daycare Center on Schwetzinger Terrasse, Heidelberg, Germany
 2012 Digiteolabs, Saclay, Moulon, Palaiseau, France; in cooperation with BRS architectes
 2012 Schlaues Haus, Oldenburg, Germany
 2013 John and Frances Angelos Law Center (with Ayers/Saint/Gross), University of Baltimore School of Law, Maryland, USA
 2013 City of Santa Monica Public Parking Structure #6 (with Studio Jantzen and IPD), Santa Monica, California, USA
 2013 City Hall Bad Aibling, Germany
 2013 Refurbishment of office spaces at Breuninger Headquarter. Stuttgart, Germany
 2013 Secondary School Ergolding (ARGE Behnisch Architekten | ALN), Germany
 2013 Habitation at the Rosengarten, Kolbermoor, Germany
 2014 WTO Security Parameter – World Trade Organization, Geneva, Switzerland
 2014 WIPO Conference Hall – World Intellectual Property Organization, Geneva, Switzerland
 2014 Haus S, Stuttgart, Germany
 2014 Refurbishment Sports Hall Lorch (designed by Behnisch & Partner 1975), Germany
 2015 Extension Spa Baths Bad Aibling, Germany
 2015 Capitol Rosenheim, Germany
 2015 Glaspalast Sindelfingen (designed by Behnisch & Partner 1976) – Refurbishment and Technical Upgrade, Sindelfingen, Germany
 2017 , Ukrainian Catholic University, Lviv, Ukraine

Current (selected projects) 
 Harvard's Allston Science and Engineering Complex, Allston, Massachusetts, USA
 Habitation Langwasser, Nuremberg, Germany
 Waldorfschule Uhlandshöhe, Stuttgart, Germany
 Lurup Neighborhood School, Hamburg, Germany
 Further Development of the School Area Bernhausen, Germany
 Paul-Winter Middl School (ARGE Behnisch Architekten | ALN), Neuburg, Germany
 Lycée Franco-allemand, Buc, France 
 Habitation at the Spinnereipark, Kolbermoor, Germany
 City Hall Großkarolinenfeld, Germany
 City Hall Gröbenzell, Germany
 Schwaketenbad, Constance, Germany
 Ludwig-Weber School, Frankfurt, Germany
 Health and Fitness Spa, Friedrichshafen, Germany
 adidas 'World Of Sports' ARENA, Herzogenaurach, Germany
 Langsdale Library (renovation), University of Baltimore, Maryland, USA
 Artists For Humanity EpiCenter (expansion), Boston, Massachusetts, USA
 Dorotheen Quartier, Stuttgart, Germany
 AGORA Cancer Research Center, Lausanne, Switzerland
 School of Business Administration, Portland State University, Portland, Oregon, USA

Awards 

 2007: Global Award for Sustainable Architecture (first edition)

Books 
 Behnisch, Behnisch & Partner. Bauten und Entwürfe. Birkhäuser Verlag, Basel 2003, 
 Genzyme Center. fmo publishers, Stuttgart 2004, 
 NORD/LB Hannover. Hatje Cantz, Stuttgart 2002, 
 Architecture for Nature. IBN-DLO Wageningen. Schuyt & Co., Haarlem 1998, 
 Behnisch Architekten Magazine 01. fmo publishers, Stuttgart 2013, 
 Behnisch Architekten Magazine 02. fmo publishers, Stuttgart 2014,

References

External links 

 Website Behnisch Architekten

Architecture firms of Germany
21st-century German architects